Akritogyra conspicua is a species of sea snail, a marine gastropod mollusk, unassigned in the superfamily Seguenzioidea.

Description
The size of the shell varies between 1.3 mm and 2 mm.

Distribution
This species occurs in deep waters in Central and Western Mediterranean Sea.

References

External links
 

conspicua
Gastropods described in 1880